Gambler's Life is an album by jazz keyboardist Johnny Hammond. It was released in 1974 and produced by  Larry Mizell.

Track listing
Gambler's Life	5:45 (Larry Mizell)
Rhodesian Thoroughfare	6:06 (Chuck Davis, Sigidi Abdallah)
This Year's Dream	6:19 (Johnny Hammond)
Star Borne	7:51 (L. Mizell)
Back To The Projects	5:36 (L. Mizell)
Yesterday Was Cool	6:50 (L. Mizell, William Jordan) 
Virgo Lady	6:41 (Hammond)
Call On Me	4:30 (Fonce Mizell, L. Mizell)

Personnel
Johnny Hammond - Synthesizer, Electric Piano
Larry Mizell - Keyboards (Solina), Backing Vocals
Fonce Mizell - Clavinet, Trumpet, Backing Vocals
Jerry Peters - Piano
Harvey Mason, Fritz Wise - Drums
Henry Franklin, Tony Dumas - Bass
John Rowin, Mel Bolton, Melvin Ragin - Guitar
King Errisson - Congas
Al Hall - Trombone
Carl Randell, Jr - Saxophone
Stephanie Spruill - Percussion, Vocals
Freddie Perren, Backing Vocals

Production
Arranged by Johnny Hammond (tracks 3 and 8) and the Mizell brothers (all others)
Produced by Larry and Fonce Mizell for Sky High Productions, Inc.
Recording Engineers: David Hassinger; assisted by John Mills and Val Garay
Mixed by David Hassinger
Mastered by Arnie Acosta
Tracks 3 and 7 published by Char-Liz Music.  Track 8 published by Jobete Music Co., Inc.  All others published by Alruby Music, Inc.

References

External links
 Johnny Hammond-Gambler's Life at Discogs

1974 albums
CTI Records albums
Albums produced by the Mizell Brothers
Jazz-funk albums
Johnny "Hammond" Smith albums